Bilateral relations exist between the Republic of Azerbaijan and the Republic of Mali in the political, socio-economic, cultural and other spheres.

Cooperation is carried out in such areas as economy, agriculture, energy, education.

Diplomatic relations 
On November 26, 1996, the Protocol on the establishment of diplomatic relations between Azerbaijan and Mali was signed.

The Extraordinary Ambassador of Mali to Azerbaijan is Tiefing Konate.

In accordance with the order of President of Azerbaijan Ilham Aliyev dated February 27, 2013, Tariq Aliyev was appointed Extraordinary Ambassador of Azerbaijan to Mali.

High-level visits 
To participate in the second meeting of the Ministers of Labor of the Organization of Islamic Cooperation member states, held on April 23–26, 2013 in Baku, a delegation led by the Minister of Labor and Vocational Training of Mali Dialo Deydia Mohamane Cattrena visited Azerbaijan.

In May 2017, Malian President Ibrahim Boubacar Keita paid an official visit to Azerbaijan.

Economic cooperation 
According to statistics from the UN Trade Office (COMTRADE), in 2016, the volume of exports of trees, plants, bulbs, roots, cut flowers from Mali amounted to 130 US dollars.

International cooperation 
In the international arena, cooperation between countries is carried out within the framework of various international organizations: the UN, the OIC, etc.

See also 
Foreign relations of Azerbaijan
Foreign relations of Mali

References 

Mali
Azerbaijan